Kuria District was an administrative district in the Nyanza Province of Kenya. Its capital town is Kehancha (sometimes spelled as Kihancha). The district has a population of 256,086 (2009 census) and an area of 581/km2. It is inhabited by a minority group of people fondly known as Kuria people also referred to as Abakuria (Mkuria/Wakuria) in Swahili. They are scattered across the Kenya- Tanzania border and they are neighbors to the Kisii, Luo and Maasai people.

Following the Referendum of 2010 and the promulgation of the Constitution of Kenya, Kuria District became part of Migori County which is under the leadership of His Excellency Governor Dr. Ochilo G. M. Ayacko. together with his deputy Hon. Joseph Gimunta Mahiri.

Kuria district was split into two in December 2007, Kuria West district with Kehancha as the district capital and Kuria East district with Kegonga as the district capital.

Kuria West covers three administrative divisions namely Kehancha, Mabera and Masaba Divisions while Kuria East spans the two administrative divisions namely Kegonga and Ntimaru.

There are two constituencies in the former District, Kuria West and Kuria East. According to the 2009 Kenya Population and housing census, Kuria West has a total population of 162,857 (National 2009). It is currently headed by Mathias Robi Nyamabe who was re-elected for a third time into the position of the member of parliament and Kuria East is headed by Hon. Kitayama Marwa Kemero Maisori and has a total population of 93,229 as stated in the 2009 population census.

Both Mathias and Kitayama won their seats under the United Democratic Alliance party ticket (UDA). Kuria District is divided into five administrative divisions namely:

Organizations
 Laurenti Mohochi Educational Foundation
 Nuru International
 Action Aid
 Soteni International

Notable residents 
 Samson Mwita Marwa, Member of Parliament

 
Former districts of Kenya

References